Colin Dibley and Sandy Mayer won in the final 6–4, 6–7, 7–6 against Raymond Moore and Erik van Dillen.

Draw

Final

Top half

Bottom half

References
 1976 American Airlines Tennis Games Doubles Draw

American Airlines Tennis Games Doubles